The 2020–21 season was Urartu's twentieth consecutive season in the Armenian Premier League.

Season events
On 30 July, Urartu's planned friendly match against BKMA Yerevan was cancelled.

On 4 August, Urartu's planned friendly match against Pyunik on 6 August was cancelled.

On 8 August, Urartu announced the signing of Jonel Désiré from Lori FC.

On 11 August, Urartu announced the signing of Juesukobiruo Okotie from Sporting Warri FC, whilst defender Narek Petrosyan left Urartu the following day by mutual consent.

On 17 August, the Football Federation of Armenia announced that that day's match between Urartu and Lori would not take place as Lori still had players and staff in isolation following an outbreak of COVID-19.

On 31 August, Narek Petrosyan re-signed for Urartu.

On 12 September, Urartu announced the signing of Pavlo Stepanets from Ararat Yerevan.

On 29 September, the season was suspended indefinitely due to the escalating 2020 Nagorno-Karabakh conflict. On 13 October, the FFA announced that the season would resume on 17 October.

On 2 November, Urartu's game against Pyunik was postponed due to positive COVID-19 cases within the Pyunik team.

On 22 November, Urartu announced the signing of Isah Aliyu after he'd left Al-Shoulla.

On 11 January, Pavlo Stepanets left Urartu after his contract was terminated by mutual consent.

On 27 January, Robert Darbinyan left Urartu to join FC Pyunik.

On 2 February, Urartu announced the signing of Vadym Paramonov from Rukh Lviv.

On 8 February, Yevgeni Osipov left Urartu by mutual consent.

On 12 February, Urartu announced the return of Yevhen Budnik from Persita Tangerang.

On 17 February, Urartu announced the signing of Pyotr Ten from FC Minsk.

On 18 February, Igor Paderin came out of retirement to re-join Urartu, with Salomon Nirisarike joining from Pyunik the following day.

On 28 February, Urartu announced the signing of Artur Miranyan.

On 9 March, Urartu announced the departure of Aleksandr Grigoryan as Head Coach, with Tigran Yesayan being put in temporary charge.

On 9 April, David Papikyan left Urartu after his contract was terminated by mutual consent.

Squad

Out on loan

Transfers

In

Out

Loans out

Released

Friendlies

Competitions

Premier League

Results summary

Results by round

Results

Table

Armenian Cup

Statistics

Appearances and goals

|-
|colspan="14"|Players away on loan:
|-
|colspan="14"|Players who left Urartu during the season:

|}

Goal scorers

Clean sheets

Disciplinary Record

References

FC Urartu seasons
Urartu